Texians were Anglo-American residents of Mexican Texas and, later, the Republic of Texas. Today, the term is used to identify early settlers of Texas, especially those who supported the Texas Revolution. Mexican settlers of that era are referred to as Tejanos, and residents of modern Texas are known as Texans.

History

Colonial settlement
Many different settlers groups came to Texas over the centuries. Spanish colonists in the 17th century linked Texas to the rest of New Spain. French and English traders and settlers arrived in the 18th century, and more numerous German, Dutch, Swedish, Irish, Scottish, Scots-Irish, and Welsh settled in the years leading up to Texas independence in 1836. Before Texas became a sovereign state in 1836, Texian referred to any resident, of any race, color or language.

In 18341836, the Texian Army was organized for the Texas Revolution of independence from Mexico, a nation which had won its independence from Spain in 1821. The Texian Army was a diverse group of people from many different nations and states. The Texian Army was composed of Tejano volunteers, volunteers from the Southern United States; and people from England, Germany, the Netherlands, Sweden, Ireland, Scotland, Wales, Portugal, and what is now the Czech Republic. Used in this sense, terms like "Texian Army", "Texian forces", or "Texian troops" would refer to any of the inhabitants of Texas, in that era, who participated in the Texas Revolution.

Republic of Texas
Texian was a popular demonym, used by Texas colonists, for all the people of the Republic of Texas (1836-1846), before it became a U.S. state. This term was used by early colonists and public officials, including many Texas residents, and President Mirabeau Lamar frequently used it to foster Texas nationalism.

Over time, the English-speaking Americans in Texas began to champion the usage of "Texan" instead of "Texian". Overwhelming numbers in the United States used the term Texan. Due to the 19th-century influx of Americans into the Republic and later U.S. state of Texas, Texan became the standard term after 1850. 

The Texas Almanac of 1857 bemoaned the shift in usage, saying 
"Texian...has more euphony, and is better adapted to the conscience of poets who shall hereafter celebrate our deeds in sonorous strains than the harsh, abrupt, ungainly, appellation, Texan—impossible to rhyme with anything but the merest doggerel." The Almanac continued to use the earlier term until 1868. Many who had lived through the times of Revolution and Republic continued to call themselves Texians into the 20th century.

Armed forces 

 Texian Militia
Texian Navy

See also 

 Texian Government

References

External links
 
 The Texian Legacy Association site

 
American regional nicknames
Demonyms
Mexican Texas
Republic of Texas
Texas Revolution
Texas society
White American culture in Texas
English-American history